Kang Zhang is a Chinese-American ophthalmologist specializing in ophthalmic genetics and aging processes in the eye. He is currently a Professor of the Faculty of Medicine at Macau University of Science and Technology. He was previously a Professor of Ophthalmology and the Founding Director of the Institute for Genomic Medicine at the University of California, San Diego. Zhang is particularly known for his work on lanosterol, stem cell research (particularly limbal stem cells), gene editing, and artificial intelligence.

Education
Born in Chengdu, Sichuan Province, China, Zhang obtained his B.S. in Biochemistry from Sichuan University in Chengdu, China in 1984. In 1991, Zhang graduated with a Ph.D. in Genetics from Harvard University. Subsequently, Zhang obtained his M.D. from a Harvard University Medical School and Massachusetts Institute of Technology Joint M.D. Program with magna cum laude honors in 1995.

Career
After completing an ophthalmology residency at the Wilmer Eye Institute at Johns Hopkins University, Zhang became Assistant Staff at the Cole Eye Institute at the Cleveland Clinic Foundation. Zhang completed a retina fellowship at the University of Utah, and afterwards became Assistant Professor at the University of Utah from 2002 to 2006.

In 2013, Zhang, along with Trey Ideker, identified that the molecular aging clock could be measured by blood and tissues, and made use of epigenetic markers.

In 2014, Zhang, along with Yizhi Liu and Xiangdong Fu, investigated mechanisms and developed a new method of limbal stem cell repair and regeneration. Zhang has also pioneered the usage of artificial intelligence in diagnosing eye diseases.

In 2015, Zhang discovered that lanosterol can be used in eyedrop form to help prevent cataracts.

In 2019, Zhang took on a new position at the Faculty of Medicine of Macau University of Science and Technology.

Awards
Some of Kang Zhang's selected awards are listed below.
The Ophthalmologist World 100 Power List (2016, 2018)
Fellow, American Institute for Medical and Biological Engineering (2016)
Fellow, Association of American Physicians (2011)
Fellow, American Association for the Advancement of Science (2011)
America's Top Ophthalmologists, Consumer's Research Council of America (2011)
NIH Director's Transformative R01 Program (2010)
Senior Investigator Award, Research to Prevent Blindness (2010)
Outstanding Achievement Award, Chinese Ophthalmological Society (2009)
Burroughs Wellcome Fund Clinical Scientist Award in Translational Research (2008)
Lew R. Wasserman Merit Award, Research to Prevent Blindness (2006)
Macular Society membership (2006)
American Society of Clinical Investigation membership (2006)
Macular Vision Research Award (2002)
Ruth Steinbach Fund for Macular Degeneration (2001)
Charles Schepens Award for Excellence in Retina Research (2001)
Johns Hopkins Medical Institutions Clinician Scientist Award (1999)

Professional affiliations
Kang Zhang's professional affiliations are listed below.
American Academy of Ophthalmology
American Institute for Medical and Biological Engineering
American Association for the Advancement of Science
American Society for Clinical Investigation
American Society of Human Genetics
Association for Research in Vision and Ophthalmology
Association of American Physicians
Macula Society

Selected publications

To date, Zhang has published more than 150 papers. Some selected publications are listed below.

References

External links
Kang Zhang official website
Publications on PubMed

American medical academics
Living people
American ophthalmologists
Harvard Medical School alumni
Massachusetts Institute of Technology alumni
University of California, San Diego faculty
People from Chengdu
Year of birth missing (living people)
Educators from Sichuan